Elias Mertel (also Mertelius, Martelius; c. 1561–1626) was a German lutenist, composer and intabulator of the Late Renaissance era. He was originally from Wangenbourg and worked in the employ of Friedrich IV until 1595, then becoming financial manager in the Academy of Strasbourg. He published collections of lute music, notably Hortus Musicalis in Strasbourg in 1615 including fantasies, preludes and fugues. Authorship of the work is uncertain.

References

1560s births
1626 deaths
German classical composers
Renaissance composers
People from Bas-Rhin
German lutenists
German male classical composers